French School in Gothenburg ( or ) was founded in 1992 in Gothenburg by Medborgarskolan. The reason was the influx of families from France, after a collaboration between the automobile manufactures Volvo and Renault started.

The school is located in the district of Landala. The school offers classes from kindergarten to ninth grade. And the premises are situated in Viktor Rydbergsgatan and Landalagången.

School profile is French. It does not mean that all the lessons are in French but that the students have French lessons from their first class. The school's headmistress is Ellenore Sinclair. The school offers CNED. Franska Skolan GbG also has a song based on the famous song ‘Les Champs-Élysées’ this is how it goes: 
A franska Skolan padadadada;
A franska Skolan padadadada;
Från Paris till Göteborg från Asien till Afrika det finns nåt för allas smak på franska skolan.

(The song is longer)

Grades
 La Crèche
 Petit section
 Moyenne section
 Grande section 
 Små-ettan (zero grade)
 Ettan (first grade)
 Tvåan (second grade)
 Trean (third grade)
 Fyran (fourth grade)
 Femman (fifth grade)
 Sexan (sixth grade)
 Sjuan (seventh grade)
 Åttan (eight grade)
 Nian (ninth grade)
 Focus (special grade)

References 

(Most of this information is from a present student)

External links
  

Education in Gothenburg
Schools in Sweden